Compass, Inc. is an American licensed real estate broker that utilizes the Internet as a marketing medium with the use of real estate technology. Compass employs more than 25,000 agents who earn a percentage of the selling price and give a percentage of each commission to Compass, consistent with the traditional real estate brokerage business model. Compass specializes in high-margin, luxury homes in upscale markets. Founded in 2012, the company is headquartered in New York City. The company provides software to real estate agents. Compass is the first company to have built a proprietary mobile app for real estate agents.

Compass operates in 20 U.S. markets including New York, Philadelphia, and Boston.

Compass has raised a total of US$1.5 billion from investors such as Founders Fund, Wellington Management and Institutional Venture Partners, Fidelity Investments, Dragoneer Investment Group, Canada Pension Plan Investment Board and SoftBank Vision Fund. Compass was named Mid-Sized Business of the Year by the Manhattan Chamber of Commerce in 2015. Compass was named to Crain's Fast 50, Inc. 5000, and Glassdoor's Best Places to Work in 2018. Compass received a Webby Award for Best Real Estate Website, and was named to Fast Company's Best Workplaces for Innovators in 2019. Compass won the 2020 Webby People’s Voice Award for Real Estate in the category Web.

Compass went public on April 1, 2021 with a valuation of $8.22 billion.

History 

Compass was founded by entrepreneurs Ori Allon, Robert Reffkin and Avi Dorfman as “Urban Compass” in 2012. Allon was a Director of Engineering at Twitter, and previously founded companies acquired by Twitter and Google. Reffkin had previously served as the chief of staff to the president of Goldman Sachs and worked in the White House. Avi Dorfman had previously worked at McKinsey & Company, Lehman Brothers and founded a startup. The company raised $8 million of seed funding from Founders Fund, Thrive Capital, Goldman Sachs as well as several individual investors including American Express CEO Kenneth Chenault, and ZocDoc CEO Cyrus Massoumi. The initial business model employed full-time, salaried brokers, with whom users of the platform could schedule appointments online after searching for listings on the company's desktop or mobile app. The company publicly debuted at an event in May 2013, where then-New York City Mayor Michael Bloomberg helped celebrate the launch. The company initially focused only on rentals.

In September 2013, the company raised a Series A financing round of $20 million, at a reported valuation of $150 million.
Investors included Advance Publications, Salesforce.com CEO Marc Benioff, and .406 Ventures.

At the beginning of 2014, Compass announced it would change its overall business model by contracting independent real estate agents and taking a portion of their commissions. In July 2014, Compass raised a Series B financing round of $40 million at a valuation of $360 million, according to Bloomberg. Shortly thereafter, Compass signed a lease on 25,000 square feet of office space at 90 5th Avenue.
The firm also hired Leonard Steinberg, a top-ranked real estate broker, from Douglas Elliman to serve as its president. Steinberg was named the agent with the highest sales volume in 2016 by Real Trends. The company reported having 125 agents and 70 staff at this time.

In September 2015, Compass raised a Series C financing round of $50 million at a reported valuation of $800 million. The investment was led by Institutional Venture Partners. The company also opened offices in Brooklyn, South Florida, Boston and the Hamptons.

In August 2016, Compass raised a Series D financing round of $75 million, led by Wellington Management, which brought its valuation higher than $1 billion. The company also launched a new mobile app that offers real-time data on the real estate market. Earlier in the year, the company expanded into Aspen with the acquisition of Shane Aspen Real Estate as well as Los Angeles. Reports also cited Compass's expansion into Santa Barbara and San Francisco as well as several other smaller sub-markets of their other major metro areas.

In 2017, Compass hired several new executives to its leadership team, including Madan Nagaldinne, a former Facebook and Amazon executive, as Chief People Officer, and Craig Anderson, a former Flywheel executive, as chief financial officer.

In November 2017, Compass announced $100 million in Series E investment by Fidelity Investments, followed by the December 7, 2017 announcement of a $450 million investment by Softbank Vision Fund, bringing the company valuation to $2.2 billion.

Compass also expanded into Chicago in late November 2017, signing the city's number-one real estate team. Additionally, Compass announced aggressive expansion plans to 9 more cities.

Less than a year later in September 2018, Compass announced a $400 million in Series F funding at a valuation of $4.4 billion. In addition to Softbank Vision Fund, this series was led by Qatar Investment Authority, which controls Qatar's sovereign wealth fund.  Other investors included Wellington Management, Institutional Venture Partners and Fidelity Investments. Compass also announced plans to use these funds to enter international markets and double down on creating world-leading technology. Compass planned to launch in Nashville, Houston, and Denver before the end of 2018.

Compass has promoted its "20/20 by 2020" plan, by which it would gain 20 percent market share in the top 20 markets by 2020. However, in January 2019 the company announced its intention to halt expansion, after encountering unspecified challenges. CEO Robert Reffkin acknowledged that the softening of the equity markets contributed to the decision not to enter new markets in 2019.

In November 2019, Compass announced its plan to open its India Development Centre in Hyderabad.

Compass filed to go public in March 2021 and listed on the New York Stock Exchange on April 1, 2021 under the ticker COMP. IPO shares were priced at $18 USD.

Compass formally settled with Avi Dorfman in November 2021, ending an 8-year dispute acknowledging him as a member of the founding team. The value of the settlement was undisclosed.

Services 

The Compass Concierge program assists in selling a home by covering the cost of home improvements to prepare the home for market.

Compass Bridge Loan Services provides access to bridge loan lenders, with the option to get up to six months of the loan payments fronted when the home is sold with a Compass agent.

The Compass Coming Soon program pre-markets properties on compass.com.

Technologies 
Compass Collections is a curated visual workspace that allows agents and clients to collaborate in real-time to organize homes, centralize their discussions, and monitor the market by receiving immediate status and price updates.

Compass Insights is a dashboard that contains key data points agents need to craft marketing strategies, uncover new lead-generation opportunities, and invest accordingly in the positioning of their listings.

The Marketing Center is a digital design studio for Compass agents to create customized, personalized and localized marketing materials.

Compass Markets is a mobile app that has real-time residential real estate data that provides access to recent transaction data as well as historic sales trends.

Compass CRM is a customer relationship management platform powered by artificial intelligence.

Acquisitions 

The following is a list of acquisitions by Compass:

 Lindsay Reishman Real Estate (November 2014) 
 Bushari (January 2017)
 Conlon (April 2018)
 Northwest Group Real Estate [NWG] (April 2018)
 The Hudson Company (June 2018) 
 Paragon Real Estate Group (July 2018) 
 Pacific Union International (August 2018)
 Avenue Properties (August 2018)
 Wydler Brothers (November 2018)
 Contactually (February 2019)
 Alain Pinel Realtors (March 2019)
 Stribling & Associates (April 2019)
Detectica (November 2019)
Modus (October 2020)
Glide Labs (April 2021)

References

External links
 
 

Real estate services companies of the United States
Companies listed on the New York Stock Exchange
Real estate companies established in 2012
American companies established in 2012
Softbank portfolio companies
2021 initial public offerings
Publicly traded companies based in New York City